The 2016 Florida Tarpons season was the fifth season for the American indoor football franchise, and their first in American Indoor Football.

On October 7, 2015, the Tarpons announced that they were joining American Indoor Football.

Schedule
Key:

Regular season
All start times are local to home team

Standings

Playoffs
All start times are local to home team

* — When initially announced, the Tarpons were set to play the Southern Division's third-seeded Myrtle Beach Freedom. On May 30, the Freedom replaced the Northern Division's fourth-seeded Central Penn Capitals against the West Michigan Ironmen. The Freedom's former position was replaced by the Southern Division's fourth-seed, the Savannah Steam.

Roster

References

Florida Tarpons
Florida Tarpons
Florida Tarpons